The 2004 Chatham Cup was the 77th annual nationwide knockout football competition in New Zealand.

Up to the last 16 of the competition, the cup was run in three regions (northern, central, and southern), with an open draw from the quarter-finals on.  In all, 133 teams took part in the competition. Different publications give different numbers for the rounds in the competition, with some showing two preliminary rounds followed by four rounds proper prior to quarter-finals, semi-finals and a final, and others showing one preliminary round followed by five rounds proper. The latter designations are used for the results below.

Extra time played during the 2004 Chatham Cup used the golden goal rule. 

One surprise of the 2004 competition was the performance of Sunday league social team Internationale, who reached the last 32 of the competition

The 2004 final
The final was the only Chatham Cup final to be decided by golden goal, with a Michele Zannoto goal in the 16th minute of extra time breaking the deadlock in favour of Miramar Rangers.

The Jack Batty Memorial Cup is awarded to the player adjudged to have made to most positive impact in the Chatham Cup final. The winner of the 2004 Jack Batty Memorial Cup was Tim Butterfield of Miramar Rangers.

Results

Third round

* Won on penalties by Christchurch Rangers (5-4), Internationale (7-6), and Upper Hutt City (4-2)

Fourth round

* Won on penalties by Waitakere City (6-5)

Fifth round

Quarter-finals

Semi-finals

Final

References

Rec.Sport.Soccer Statistics Foundation New Zealand 2004 page
UltimateNZSoccer website 2004 Chatham Cup page

Chatham Cup
Chatham Cup
Chatham Cup
Chat